Kategoria e Tretë is the fourth and lowest professional level of football in Albania. In the 2022−23 season Kategoria e Tretë has 13 teams participating, split in 2 groups. The winners of each group earn the right to be promoted to the Kategoria e Dytë and play a final match to determine the champions. The runners-up of each group qualify to the play-off round.

Clubs (2022-23)

Champions

See also
 List of football clubs in Albania

References

 
4
Fourth level football leagues in Europe